Domenico Marzi (born 15 February 1954) is an Italian politician and lawyer.

He is currently a member of the Democratic Party. He was born in Frosinone, Italy. He has served as Mayor of Frosinone from 1998 to 2007. He manages a law firm in Frosinone since 1979. He studied in University of Perugia.

References

External links
 Domenico Marzi on Ministry of the Interior
 Domenico Marzi on Openpolis
 Domenico Marzi on RadioRadicale.it

Living people
1954 births
People from Frosinone
Democratic Party (Italy) politicians
21st-century Italian politicians
20th-century Italian politicians
20th-century Italian lawyers
Mayors of Frosinone
University of Perugia alumni